Buturlin, feminine: Buturlina is a Russian surname of a Russian noble . Notable people with this surname include:

 Alexander Buturlin (1694–1767), a Russian general
 Anna Artemevna Buturlina (1777–1854), Russian artist and noblewoman
 Anna Buturlina (born 1977), Russian jazz singer and musical actress
 Alexander Buturlin (ice hockey) (born 1981), a Russian ice hockey player
 Dmitry Petrovich Buturlin (writer) (1790–1849), a Russian statesman and writer
 Elizabeth Divov born countess Buturlina (1762–1813), Russian courtier 
 Sergei Aleksandrovich Buturlin (1872–1938), a Russian ornithologist
 Vasili Buturlin (? – 1656), a Russian boyar and voyevoda

Russian-language surnames